The Archdeacon of West Ham is a senior ecclesiastical officer – in charge of the Archdeaconry of West Ham – in the Church of England Diocese of Chelmsford. The current archdeacon is Elwin Cockett.

Brief history
Historically, the Archdeaconry of Essex formed part of the Diocese of London, until the Victorian diocese reforms transferred it, on 1 January 1846, to the Diocese of Rochester. The title first occurs in sources before 1100, as one of four archdeacons in the (then much larger) Diocese of London, but there had been four archdeacons prior to this point, some of whom may be regarded as essentially predecessors in the line of the Essex archdeacons.

From 4 May 1877, the archdeaconry made up part of the newly created Diocese of St Albans until it became part of the newly created Diocese of Chelmsford on 23 January 1914.

On 17 March 1922, the Archdeaconry of Essex was renamed the Archdeaconry of West Ham when the new Archdeaconry of Southend was created from part of the old archdeaconry.

The role of Archdeacon of West Ham has existed separately from the Bishop suffragan of Barking since 1958; the archdeaconry was itself divided to create the Harlow archdeaconry following a 1989 decision of the Diocesan Synod and again on 1 February 2013, by Pastoral Order of the Bishop of Chelmsford, the new Archdeaconry of Barking was created from the West Ham archdeaconry; initially, the Archdeacon of West Ham was also Acting Archdeacon of Barking.

List of archdeacons

High Medieval
?–: Theobald
bef. 1102–bef. 1111: Walter
bef. 1132–1167 (d.): Richard Ruffus
bef. 1168–bef. 1196 : Robert Banastre
bef. 1204–aft. 1215: Richard de Hegham
bef. 1221–aft. 1225: Theobald de Valognes
bef. 1228–aft. 1243: Thomas de Fauconberg
bef. 1248–aft. 1250 (res.): Hugh de Sancto Edmundo
bef. 1253–aft. 1265: Stephen de Sandwic
bef. 1272–aft. 1271 (res.): Richard of Gravesend
bef. 1271–aft. 1274: Adam de Faversham
bef. 1274–1283 (res.): Roger de La Legh
bef. 1288–1293 (res.): Robert Winchelsey
bef. 1295–bef. 1297 (deprived): Laurence de Fuscis de Bera
31 March 1299–aft. 1301: Aldebrand Riccardi de Militiis

Late Medieval
bef. 1307–aft. 1307: Hildebrand de Anibaldis
29 January 1315–bef. 1319: Stephen de Segrave
bef. 1328–bef. 1331 (d.): John de Elham
2 December 1331 – 3 September 1332 (exch.): William Vygerous
3 September 1332–bef. 1333 (d.): Robert de Canterbury
9 November 1333 – 22 January 1337 (exch.): Hugh de Statherne
22 January 1337– (res.): John de Bouser
20 June 1351 – 1361 (d.): William de Rothwell
30 November 1361–bef. 1367 (res.): John Barnet (son of Bishop John Barnet)
20 June 1367–?: John de Cantebrugg
?–bef. 1368 (res.): Roger de Freton (afterwards Dean of Chichester)
18 January 1368–bef. 1400 (d.): Henry de Winterton
11 February 1400–?: Richard Prentys
bef. 1406–7 September 1420 (exch.): Edward Prentys
7 September 1420–bef. 1435 (d.): John Shirborne
5 April 1435–bef. 1461 (d.): Zanobius Mulakyn
5 August 1461 – 1472 (res.): James Goldwell (also Dean of Salisbury from 1463)
3 October 1472 – 16 May 1478 (exch.): John Gunthorpe
16 May 1478–bef. 1479 (d.): John Crall/Sudbury
22 December 1479 – 1480 (res.): Edmund Audley
21 July 1480 – 1499 (res.): Thomas Jane
4 November 1499–bef. 1502 (d.): John de Lopez
1502–23 August 1503 (d.): François de Busleyden, Archbishop of Besançon
24 January 1503–bef. 1543 (d.): Richard Rawson

Early modern
29 October 1543–bef. 1558 (d.): Edward Moylle
22 October 1558 – 23 October 1559 (deprived): Thomas Darbyshire (deprived)
3 January 1560–June 1571 (d.): Thomas Cole
10 July 1571–bef. 1585 (res.): John Walker
27 August 1585–bef. 1603 (res.): William Tabor
17 January 1603 – 1609 (res.): Samuel Harsnett
8 November 1609–bef. 1634 (d.): George Goldman
1634–11 August 1680 (d.): Edward Layfield
20 December 1680–bef. 1689 (res.): Thomas Turner
17 July 1689–bef. 1714 (d.): Charles Alston
22 July 1714–bef. 1737 (res.): Thomas Gooch
22 July 1737 – 9 August 1746 (d.): Reuben Clerke
6 February 1747 – 31 October 1752 (d.): William Gibson
28 November 1752 – 5 October 1771 (d.): Thomas Rutherforth
11 October 1771 – 5 April 1773 (d.): Stotherd Abdy
21 April 1773 – 10 November 1795 (d.): James Waller
2 December 1795 – 29 September 1813 (d.): William Gretton
11 December 1813 – 12 October 1823 (d.): Francis Wollaston
14 November 1823 – 1861 (res.): Hugh Jones
On 1 January 1846, the archdeaconry was moved to the Diocese of Rochester.

Late modern
18 February 1862 – 13 July 1878 (d.): Carew St John Mildmay
On 4 May 1877, the archdeaconry was again moved, this time to the newly-created Diocese of St Albans.
1878–1882: Alfred Blomfield
bef. 1883–17 March 1885 (d.): Gaspard-le-Marchant Carey
1885–1894 (res.): Henry Johnson
1894–22 August 1920 (d.): Thomas Stevens (as Bishop suffragan of Barking, 1901–1919)
On 23 January 1914, the archdeaconry was again moved, this time to the newly-created Diocese of Chelmsford.
1920–1922: James Inskip, Bishop suffragan of Barking (became Archdeacon of West Ham)
On 17 March 1922, the Archdeaconry of Essex was renamed to the Archdeaconry of West Ham.
1922–1948 (ret.): James Inskip, Bishop suffragan of Barking
1948–1958: Hugh Gough, Bishop suffragan of Barking
1958–25 October 1964 (d.): John Elvin
1965–1970 (res.) Denis Wakeling
1970–1975 (res.): James Adams
1975–1980 (res.): John Taylor
1980–1988 (res.): Peter Dawes
1988–1991 (res.): Roger Sainsbury
1991–1995 (res.): Tim Stevens
1995–2007 (ret.): Michael Fox
2007–present: Elwin Cockett

Notes

References

Sources

Lists of Anglicans
 
 
Lists of English people